Rhododendron subgenus Rhododendron is a subgenus of the genus Rhododendron. With around 400 species, it is the largest of the eight subgenera (more recently reduced to five) containing nearly half of all known species of Rhododendron and all of the lepidote (scales on the underside of the leaves) species.

Taxonomy

The subgenus has traditionally included three sections:
Rhododendron sect. Pogonanthum Aitch. & Hemsl, type  Rhododendron anthopogon D.Don. Six species; Himalaya and adjacent mountains
Rhododendron sect. Rhododendron L., type : Rhododendron ferrugineum L. 120 - 149 species in 25 subsections; temperate to subarctic Northern Hemisphere
Rhododendron sect. Vireya (Blume) Copel.f., type Rhododendron javanicum (Blume) Benn. About 300 species in 7 subsections; tropical southeast Asia, Australasia. Has at times been considered as a separate ninth subgenus.

However, following phylogenetic analysis, Craven (2008) raised the appropriately named Pseudovireya subsection of Vireya to section rank, splitting it into two geographic clades, the Asian mainland species as Pseudovireya, and the Malesian species as Discovireya, making five sections in all. The new sections are thus:
 Rhododendron sect. Discovireya (Sleumer) Argent, type Rhododendron retusum (Blume) Benn. 48 species, Malesia
 Rhododendron sect. Pseudodovireya (C.B.Clarke) Argent, type  Rhododendron vaccinioides Hook.f. Ten species, Mainland Asia

Characteristics: (Craven 2008)
Discovireya: Scales entire to undulate; corolla tubular-cylindric; stamens 10, exserted to included, staminal filaments glabrous or hairy from the base; capsule valves not twisting after dehiscence; seeds with a distinct tail at each end
 Pogonanthum: Scales incised; corolla salver-shaped; stamens 5–8, included, staminal filaments glabrous or hairy towards the base; capsule valves not twisting after dehiscence; seeds without distinct tails
 Pseudovireya: Scales entire; corolla campanulate; stamens 10, exserted, staminal filaments glabrous proximally and distally and hairy in the middle region; capsule valves not twisting after dehiscence; seeds with a distinct tail at each end
 Rhododendron: Scales entire to crenulate; corolla campanulate to funnel-shaped or tubular; stamens 10, exserted, staminal filaments hairy towards the base or glabrous; capsule valves not twisting after dehiscence; seeds without distinct tails
 Vireya: Scales sessile or sometimes stalked, lobed to deeply incised or sometimes entire; corolla campanulate, trumpet-like, salver-shaped, tubular or funnel-shaped; stamens (5–)10(–16), exserted to included, staminal filaments glabrous or hairy from the base; capsule valves twisting after dehiscence; seeds with a distinct tail at each end

Craven also provides a formal Key to the subgenus.

Subsections 
 Rhododendron L. (25 subsections)
 Rhododendron subsect. Afghanica
 Rhododendron subsect. Baileya
 Rhododendron subsect. Boothia
 Rhododendron subsect. Camelliiflora
 Rhododendron subsect. Campylogynum
 Rhododendron subsect. Caroliniana
 Rhododendron subsect. Cinnabarinum
  Rhododendron subsect. Edgeworthia
  Rhododendron subsect. Fragariflora
  Rhododendron subsect. Genestieriana
  Rhododendron subsect. Glauca
  Rhododendron subsect. Heliolepida
  Rhododendron subsect. Lapponica
  Rhododendron subsect. Ledum
  Rhododendron subsect. Lepidota
  Rhododendron subsect. Maddenia
  Rhododendron subsect. Micrantha
  Rhododendron subsect. Monantha
  Rhododendron subsect. Moupinensia
  Rhododendron subsect. Rhododendron
  Rhododendron subsect. Rhodorastra
  Rhododendron subsect. Saluenensia
  Rhododendron subsect. Scabrifolia
  Rhododendron subsect. Tephropepia
  Rhododendron subsect. Trichoclada
  Rhododendron subsect. Triflora
  Rhododendron subsect. Uniflora
  Rhododendron subsect. Virgata

References

Bibliography
Germplasm Resources Information Network: Rhododendron subgenus Rhododendron
Huxley, A., ed. (1992). New RHS Dictionary of Gardening. Macmillan.
Gillian K. Brown, Lyn A. Craven, Frank Udovicic and Pauline Y. Ladiges. Phylogenetic relationships of Rhododendron section Vireya (Ericaceae) inferred from the ITS nrDNA region. Australian Systematic Botany 19, 329–342. August 2006. 10.1071/SB05019

External links

Rhododendron
Plant subgenera